Boiling Springs High School is the name for several schools including:

 Boiling Springs High School (Pennsylvania)
 Boiling Springs High School (South Carolina)